Musagitovo (Mösäğit) is a rural locality (a village) in Imay-Karmalinsky Selsoviet, Davlekanovsky District, Bashkortostan, Russia. The population was 35 as of 2010. There is 1 street.

Geography 
Musagitovo is located 37 km northeast of Davlekanovo (the district's administrative centre) by road. Batraki is the nearest rural locality.

References 

Rural localities in Davlekanovsky District